Chak No 114/DNB is a chak (village) near Bahawalpur, Yazman Tehsil, Pakistani Punjab.

Villages in Bahawalpur District